Established in 1939, the American Osteopathic Association's (AOA) Bureau of Osteopathic Specialists (BOS) is the supervisory body for the AOA's 16 Specialty Certifying Boards in the United States. The BOS establishes and enforces policy for board certification through the AOA  Specialty Certifying Boards and maintains high standards for certification through the development and implementation of educational and professional standards used to evaluate and certify osteopathic and non-osteopathic (MD and equivalent) physician.
 
AOA Board Certification is recognized by key healthcare accreditation organizations. The AOA is also recognized as the primary verification source for physician osteopathic board certification data on medical specialists for credentialing purposes.

History
The concept of a specialty board was first proposed in 1908 by Dr. Derrick T. Vail. In 1916, ophthalmology became the first officially incorporated board. The second specialty board, the American Board of Otolaryngology, was founded and incorporated in 1924. The American Board of Obstetrics and Gynecology (1930) and the American Board of Dermatology and Syphilology (1932) followed. The AOABOS was organized in 1939 as the Advisory Board for Osteopathic Specialists for the certification of osteopathic physicians. The first medical specialty board part of the AOABOS was the American Osteopathic Board of Radiology. In 1993, the Board of Trustees of the American Osteopathic Association (AOA), through its agency, the Bureau of Osteopathic Specialists, became the osteopathic certifying body.

Member boards
The following are the specialty certifying boards of the American Osteopathic Association:
 American Osteopathic Board of Anesthesiology
 American Osteopathic Board of Dermatology
 American Osteopathic Board of Emergency Medicine
 American Osteopathic Board of Family Physicians
 American Osteopathic Board of Internal Medicine
 American Osteopathic Board of Neurology and Psychiatry
 American Osteopathic Board of Neuromusculoskeletal Medicine
 American Osteopathic Board of Nuclear Medicine
 American Osteopathic Board of Obstetrics and Gynecology
 American Osteopathic Board of Ophthalmology and Otolaryngology
 American Osteopathic Board of Orthopedic Surgery
 American Osteopathic Board of Pathology
 American Osteopathic Board of Pediatrics
 American Osteopathic Board of Physical Medicine and Rehabilitation
 American Osteopathic Board of Preventive Medicine
 American Osteopathic Board of Proctology
 American Osteopathic Board of Radiology
 American Osteopathic Board of Surgery

See also
American Board of Medical Specialties
 American Board of Physician Specialties
Residency (medicine)
Fellowship (medicine)

References

External links
 Page for the specialty boards at  the Official AOA Site
List of Specialty boards

Osteopathic medical associations in the United States
Medical and health professional associations in Chicago